Publications of the Astronomical Society of Japan (PASJ) is a peer-reviewed scientific journal of astronomy published by the Astronomical Society of Japan on a bimonthly basis. The journal was established in 1949. The current editor-in-chief is S. Nagataki.

See also 
List of astronomy journals

External links
 Publications of the Astronomical Society of Japan website
 List of PASJ editors throughout the years

Astronomy journals
Bimonthly journals
Publications established in 1949
English-language journals
Academic journals published by learned and professional societies